Molly McGrann is an American literary critic, poet, and novelist. She is an alumna  of Skidmore College and New York University. She lives in England.

Biography
McGrann graduated from Skidmore College, in 1995, and went on to receive an MFA in Creative Writing from New York University in New York City. She is a literary critic and the author of two novels.

In December 1998, McGrann married musician Colin Greenwood of Radiohead in Oxford, England.  They live in a small village in Oxfordshire with their three sons, Jesse, Asa and Henry.

Writing
McGrann has worked as a reviewer for the Times Literary Supplement and as a contributing editor for The Paris Review.  She has also had poems published in various literary magazines including TriQuarterly and Arion. She is a London Editor of A Public Space, a quarterly literary magazine, founded in 2005 by Brigid Hughes, former Executive Editor of The Paris Review.

Her first novel, 360 Flip, looked at the tensions lying below the surface of the "American Dream" in a 60s Levittown-style suburb, through the eyes of a disillusioned young poet growing up there in the 1950s. It was dedicated to her husband.

Exurbia, McGrann's second novel, set in Los Angeles in the mid 80s during the Reagan era, is about the mentally ill living in the margins of society. It follows an insecure thirteen-year-old woman suffering from bipolar disorder, Lise, and the parallel story of Ed Valencia, as their lives become entangled with the violent world of  L.A.'s homeless gangs. It was dedicated to her parents.

Works

Fiction
 360 Flip (2004)
 Exurbia (2007)
 The Ladies of the House (2015)

Poetry

  From Less Than Spring, a long poem of conditions. (1999)
  Hermaphroditus (2002)

References

External links
 A Public Space official website
 Arts | Telegraph Review of 360 Flip
 Mail&Guardian Za@Play Review of Exurbia

21st-century American novelists
American expatriates in the United Kingdom
American literary critics
Women literary critics
American women novelists
New York University alumni
Skidmore College alumni
Year of birth missing (living people)
Living people
American women poets
21st-century American women writers
21st-century American poets
American women non-fiction writers
21st-century American non-fiction writers
American women critics